Janny may refer to:

People

Surname

Georg Janny (1864-1935), Austrian landscape painter and set designer

Given name
Janny Brandes-Brilleslijper (1916–2003), Dutch Holocaust survivor, among the last people to see Anne Frank
Janny Sikazwe (born 1979), Zambian football referee
Janny Wurts (born 1953), American fantasy novelist and illustrator

Other 
Internet slang for Forum Moderator, in the sense that they are the "Janitor" of a community.

See also
Jenny (disambiguation)
Jannie